Bergstraße or Bergstrasse can refer to:

Bergstraße Route, literally "Mountain Road", in the Odenwald of Baden-Württemberg and Hesse, Germany
Bergstraße (district), a district in Hesse, Germany
Hessische Bergstraße, a Hessian winegrowing region
Badische Bergstraße, a winegrowing region in Baden-Württemberg, Germany